The 2009 San Francisco Giants season was the Giants' 127th year in Major League Baseball, their 52nd year in San Francisco since their move from New York following the 1957 season, and their 10th at AT&T Park. After four consecutive losing seasons, the team finished in third place in the National League West with an 88–74 record, 7 games behind the Los Angeles Dodgers.  Following Peter Magowan's retirement, Bill Neukom served as general managing partner of the Giants. After a season with the fewest home runs of any team since the 1993 Florida Marlins, general manager Brian Sabean said the Giants would attempt to bring in a power hitter as well as strengthening a bullpen that held a 4.45 ERA in 2008, fourteenth in the National League.

After leading the National League Wild Card race for most of the season, the Giants were ultimately passed by the Colorado Rockies. The team finished third in the NL West and second in the Wild Card. Though they missed the playoffs, the Giants surpassed most expectations for their season; for example, Sports Illustrated projected that the Giants would finish with a record of 77–85. Sports Illustrateds Lee Jenkins noted San Francisco's promising farm system (including products Pablo Sandoval and Madison Bumgarner) and the perceived weakness of the NL West as reasons to be optimistic about the Giants' potential. Additionally, the Giants' starting rotation boasted three Cy Young Award winners: Randy Johnson, Tim Lincecum, and Barry Zito. After the season ended, Lincecum won his second straight Cy Young. The Giants would build on their surprising 2009 season the following year, winning the World Series. It would be their first in San Francisco.

Regular season

Notable events
 June 4 — Randy Johnson joins the 300 win club with a 5–1 victory over the Washington Nationals
 July 10 — Jonathan Sánchez throws a no-hitter against the San Diego Padres, the first by a Giant since September 29, 1976
 July 14 — Starting pitchers Tim Lincecum and Matt Cain are voted to the 2009 All-Star Game, with Lincecum being named the NL starting pitcher
 July 19 – Team majority owner Sue Burns dies of lung cancer
 July 27 — Giants trade pitching prospect Scott Barnes to the Cleveland Indians for first baseman Ryan Garko
 July 29 — Giants trade pitching prospect Tim Alderson to the Pittsburgh Pirates for second baseman Freddy Sanchez
 September 23 — Giants defeat the Arizona Diamondbacks 5–2, guaranteeing their first winning season since the 2004 campaign
 November 19 — Tim Lincecum wins his second consecutive Cy Young Award

Season standings

Record vs. opponents

Game log

|- align="center" bgcolor="bbffbb"
| 1 || April 7 || Brewers || 10–6 || Martinez (1–0) || Suppan (0–1) || || 42,767 || 1–0
|- align="center" bgcolor="#ffbbbb"
| 2 || April 8 || Brewers || 4–2 || Gallardo (1–0) || Johnson (0–1) || Villanueva (1) || 40,764 || 1–1
|- align="center" bgcolor="bbffbb"
| 3 || April 9 || Brewers || 7–1 || Cain (1–0) || Parra (0–1) || || 30,027 || 2–1
|- align="center" bgcolor="#ffbbbb"
| 4 || April 10 || @ Padres || 7–3 || Hill (1–0) || Zito (0–1) || || 20,507 || 2–2
|- align="center" bgcolor="#ffbbbb"
| 5 || April 11 || @ Padres || 6–3 || Peavy (1–1) || Sánchez (0–1) || Bell (3) || 35,305 || 2–3
|- align="center" bgcolor="#ffbbbb"
| 6 || April 12 || @ Padres || 6–1 || Young (2–0) || Lincecum (0–1)  || || 19,415 || 2–4
|- align="center" bgcolor="#ffbbbb"
| 7 || April 13 || @ Dodgers || 11–1 || Billingsley (2–0) || Johnson (0–2) || || 57,099 || 2–5
|- align="center" bgcolor="#ffbbbb"
| 8 || April 15 || @ Dodgers || 5–4 || Broxton (1–0) || Howry (0–1) || || 42,511 || 2–6
|- align="center" bgcolor="#ffbbbb"
| 9 || April 16 || @ Dodgers || 7–2 || Stults (2–0) || Zito (0–2) || || 36,553 || 2–7
|- align="center" bgcolor="bbffbb"
| 10 || April 17 || Diamondbacks || 2–0 || Sánchez (1–1) || Haren (0–3) || Wilson (1) || 34,898 || 3–7
|- align="center" bgcolor="#ffbbbb"
| 11 || April 18 || Diamondbacks || 2–0 || Davis (1–2) || Affeldt (0–1) || Qualls || 37,409 || 3–8
|- align="center" bgcolor="bbffbb"
| 12 || April 19 || Diamondbacks || 2–0 || Johnson (1–2) || Scherzer (0–1) || Wilson (2) || 35,350 || 4–8
|- align="center" bgcolor="bbffbb"
| 13 || April 21 || Padres || 8–3 || Cain (2–0) || Peavy (2–2) || || 39,314 || 5–8
|- align="center" bgcolor="bbffbb"
| 14 || April 22 || Padres || 1–0 (10) || Wilson (1–0) || Moreno (0–2) || || 26,593 || 6–8
|- align="center" bgcolor="bbffbb"
| 15 || April 24 || @ Diamondbacks || 5–1 || Lincecum (1–1) || Davis (1–3) || || 27,865 || 7–8
|- align="center" bgcolor="bbffbb"
| 16 || April 25 || @ Diamondbacks || 5–3 || Miller (1–0) || Scherzer (0–2) || Wilson (3) || 37,253 || 8–8
|- align="center" bgcolor="#ffbbbb"
| 17 || April 26 || @ Diamondbacks || 5–4 (12) || Gutiérrez (1–1) || Medders (0–1) || || 31,862 || 8–9
|- align="center" bgcolor="bbffbb"
| 18 || April 27 || Dodgers || 5–4 || Valdéz (1–0) || Belisario (0–2) || Wilson (4) || 30,091 || 9–9
|- align="center" bgcolor="#ffbbbb"
| 19 || April 28 || Dodgers || 5–3 || Broxton (2–0) || Howry (0–2) || Ohman (1) || 30,482 || 9–10
|- align="center" bgcolor="bbffbb"
| 20 || April 29 || Dodgers || 9–4 || Lincecum (2–1) || Stults (2–1) || Wilson (5) || 37,717 || 10–10
|-

|- align="center"  bgcolor="bbffbb"
| 21 || May 1 || Rockies || 3–2 || Johnson (2–2) || Jiménez (1–4) || Wilson (6) || 30,791 || 11–10
|- align="center"  bgcolor="#ffbbbb"
| 22 || May 2 || Rockies || 5–1 || Marquis (4–1) || Cain (2–1) || || 30,166 || 11–11
|- align="center" bgcolor="bbffbb"
| 23 || May 3 || Rockies || 1–0 (10) || Medders (1–1) || Corpas (0–3) || || 30,650 || 12–11
|- align="center" bgcolor="ffbbbb"
| 24 || May 4 || @ Cubs || 4–2|| Dempster (2–1) || Sánchez (1–2) || Gregg (4) || 39,112 || 12–12
|- align="center" bgcolor="bbffbb"
| 25 || May 5 || @ Cubs || 6–2 || Lincecum (3–1) || Marshall (0–2) || || 39,497 || 13–12
|- align="center" bgcolor="ffbbbb"
| 26 || May 6 || @ Rockies || 11–1 || Jiménez (2–4) || Johnson (2–3) || || 22,105 || 13–13
|- align="center" bgcolor="bbffbb"
| 27 || May 7 || @ Rockies || 8–3 || Cain (3–1) || Marquis (4–2) || || 23,453 || 14–13
|- align="center" bgcolor="bbffbb"
| 28 || May 8 || @ Dodgers || 3–1 || Zito (1–2) || Billingsley (5–1) || Wilson (7) || 51,209 || 15–13
|- align="center" bgcolor="ffbbbb"
| 29 || May 9 || @ Dodgers || 8–0 || Stults (4–1) || Sánchez (1–3) || || 41,425 || 15–14
|- align="center" bgcolor="bbffbb"
| 30 || May 10 || @ Dodgers || 7–5 (13) || Wilson (2–0) || Mota (2–1) || || 37,529 || 16–14
|- align="center" bgcolor="bbffbb"
| 31 || May 11 || Nationals || 11–7 || Johnson (3–3) || Cabrera (0–4) || Wilson (8) || 23,934 || 17–14
|- align="center" bgcolor="bbffbb"
| 32 || May 12 || Nationals || 9–7 || Medders (2–1) || Beimel (0–2) || || 25,701 || 18–14
|- align="center" bgcolor="ffbbbb"
| 33 || May 13 || Nationals || 6–3 || Martis (5–0) || Zito (1–3) || Wells (2) || 30,120 || 18–15
|- align="center" bgcolor="ffbbbb"
| 34 || May 14 || Mets || 7–4 || Parnell (2–0) || Wilson (2–1) || Rodríguez (10) || 30,154 || 18–16
|- align="center" bgcolor="ffbbbb"
| 35 || May 15 || Mets || 8–6 || Stokes (1–1) || Wilson (2–2) || Rodríguez (11) || 41,684 || 18–17
|- align="center" bgcolor="ffbbbb"
| 36 || May 16 || Mets || 9–6 || Santana (5–2) || Johnson (3–4) || Putz (1) || 41,366 || 18–18
|- align="center" bgcolor="bbffbb"
| 37 || May 17 || Mets || 2–0 || Cain (4–1) || Pelfrey (4–1) || Wilson (9) || 43,012 || 19–18
|- align="center" bgcolor="ffbbbb"
| 38 || May 19 || @ Padres || 2–1 || Young (3–2) || Zito (1–4) || Bell (10) || 16,175 || 19–19
|- align="center" bgcolor="ffbbbb"
| 39 || May 20 || @ Padres || 2–1 || Gaudin (1–3) || Sánchez (1–4) || Bell (11) || 15,208 || 19–20
|- align="center" bgcolor="ffbbbb"
| 40 || May 21 || @ Padres || 3–2 || Bell (2–0) || Wilson (2–3) || || 19,921 || 19–21
|- align="center" bgcolor="ffbbbb"
| 41 || May 22 || @ Mariners || 2–1 (12) || White (1–0) || Miller (1–1) || || 38,520 || 19–22
|- align="center" bgcolor="bbffbb"
| 42 || May 23 || @ Mariners || 5–1 || Cain (5–1) || Lowe (0–2) || || 33,348 || 20–22
|- align="center" bgcolor="ffbbbb"
| 43 || May 24 || @ Mariners || 5–4 || Hernández (5–3) || Zito (1–5) || Aardsma (6) || 36,616 || 20–23
|- align="center" bgcolor="bbffbb"
| 44 || May 25 || Braves || 8–2 || Sánchez (2–4) || Vázquez (4–4) || || 40,034 || 21–23
|- align="center" bgcolor="bbffbb"
| 45 || May 26 || Braves || 4–0 || Lincecum (4–1) || Medlen (0–2) || || 29,485 || 22–23
|- align="center" bgcolor="bbffbb"
| 46 || May 27 || Braves || 6–3 || Johnson (4–4) || Kawakami (3–6) || Wilson (10) || 27,744 || 23–23
|- align="center" bgcolor="bbffbb"
| 47 || May 29 || Cardinals || 4–2 || Cain (6–1) || Piñeiro (5–5) || Wilson (11) || 35,266 || 24–23
|- align="center" bgcolor="ffbbbb"
| 48 || May 30 || Cardinals || 6–2 || Carpenter (3–0) || Zito (1–6) || || 35,592 || 24–24
|- align="center" bgcolor="bbffbb"
| 49 || May 31 || Cardinals || 5–3 || Valdéz (2–0) || Wainwright (5–3) || Wilson (12) || 41,440 || 25–24
|-

|- align="center" bgcolor="ffbbbb"
| 50 || June 2 || @ Nationals || 10–6 || Villone (3–0) || Howry (0–3) || || 17,331 || 25–25
|- align="center" bgcolor="bbbbbb"
| – || June 3 || @ Nationals || colspan=6|Postponed (rain)  Rescheduled for June 4
|- align="center" bgcolor="bbffbb"
| 51 || June 4 || @ Nationals || 5–1 || Johnson (5–4) || Zimmermann (2–3) || Wilson (13) ||  || 26–25
|- align="center" bgcolor="bbffbb"
| 52 || June 4 || @ Nationals || 4–1 (6) || Cain (7–1) || Detwiler (0–2) || || 16,787 || 27–25
|- align="center" bgcolor="bbffbb"
| 53 || June 5 || @ Marlins || 2–1 || Zito (2–6) || Volstad (4–5) || Wilson (14) || 12,841 || 28–25
|- align="center" bgcolor="ffbbbb"
| 54 || June 6 || @ Marlins || 5–4 || Miller (2–2) || Sánchez (2–5) || Núñez (2) || 16,294 || 28–26
|- align="center" bgcolor="bbffbb"
| 55 || June 7 || @ Marlins || 3–2 || Lincecum (5–1) || Nolasco (2–6) || Wilson (15) || 11,505 || 29–26
|- align="center" bgcolor="ffbbbb"
| 56 || June 8 || @ Marlins || 4–0 || West (1–1) || Johnson (5–5) || || 12,068 || 29–27
|- align="center" bgcolor="bbffbb"
| 57 || June 9 || @ Diamondbacks || 9–4 || Cain (8–1) || Buckner (2–2) || || 22,428 || 30–27
|- align="center" bgcolor="bbffbb"
| 58 || June 10 || @ Diamondbacks || 6–4 || Zito (3–6) || Davis (3–7) || Wilson (16) || 19,837 || 31–27
|- align="center" bgcolor="ffbbbb"
| 59 || June 11 || @ Diamondbacks || 2–1 || Scherzer (3–4) || Sánchez (2–6) || Qualls (13) || 24,389 || 31–28
|- align="center" bgcolor="bbffbb"
| 60 || June 12 || Athletics || 3–0 || Lincecum (6–1) || Mazzaro (2–1) || || 36,035 || 32–28
|- align="center" bgcolor="bbffbb"
| 61 || June 13 || Athletics || 5–2 || Johnson (6–5) || Outman (4–1) || Wilson (17) || 37,874 || 33–28
|- align="center" bgcolor="bbffbb"
| 62 || June 14 || Athletics || 7–1 || Cain (9–1) || Anderson (3–7) || || 37,728 || 34–28
|- align="center" bgcolor="ffbbbb"
| 63 || June 15 || Angels || 9–7 || Lackey (2–2) || Zito (3–7) || Fuentes (17)|| 33,613 || 34–29
|- align="center" bgcolor="ffbbbb"
| 64 || June 16 || Angels || 8–1 || O'Sullivan (1–0) || Sánchez (2–7) || || 34,716 || 34–30
|- align="center" bgcolor="ffbbbb"
| 65 || June 17 || Angels || 4–3 || Jepsen (1–2) || Lincecum (6–2) || Fuentes (18) || 37,431 || 34–31
|- align="center" bgcolor="bbffbb"
| 66 || June 19 || Rangers || 6–4 || Romo (1–0) || Feldman (5–2) || Wilson (18) || 31,241 || 35–31
|- align="center" bgcolor="bbffbb"
| 67 || June 20 || Rangers || 2–1 (11) || Romo (2–0) || Jennings (2–3) || || 33,312 || 36–31
|- align="center" bgcolor="bbffbb"
| 68 || June 21 || Rangers || 3–2 || Zito (4–7) || Millwood (7–5) || Wilson (19) || 41,292 || 37–31
|- align="center" bgcolor="ffbbbb"
| 69 || June 22 || @ Athletics || 5–1 || Cahill (5–5) || Sánchez (2–8) || Ziegler (6) || 27,324 || 37–32
|- align="center" bgcolor="bbffbb"
| 70 || June 23 || @ Athletics || 4–1 || Lincecum (7–2) || Mazzaro (2–2) || || 32,854 || 38–32
|- align="center" bgcolor="bbffbb"
| 71 || June 24 || @ Athletics || 6–3 || Johnson (7–5) || Gonzalez (0–1) || Wilson (20) || 35,067 || 39–32
|- align="center" bgcolor="ffbbbb"
| 72 || June 26 || @ Brewers || 5–1 || Gallardo (8–4) || Cain (9–2) || || 37,345 || 39–33
|- align="center" bgcolor="ffbbbb"
| 73 || June 27 || @ Brewers || 7–6  || Hoffman (1–1) || Wilson (2–4) || || 42,065 || 39–34
|- align="center" bgcolor="bbffbb"
| 74 || June 28 || @ Brewers || 7–0 || Sadowski (1–0) || Suppan (5–6) || || 43,391 || 40–34
|- align="center" bgcolor="bbffbb"
| 75 || June 29 || @ Cardinals || 10–0 || Lincecum (8–2) || Thompson (2–4) || || 37,737 || 41–34
|- align="center" bgcolor="bbffbb"
| 76 || June 30 || @ Cardinals || 6–3 || Johnson (8–5) || Carpenter (5–3) || Wilson (21) || 37,174 || 42–34
|-

|- align="center" bgcolor="ffbbbb"
| 77 || July 1 || @ Cardinals || 2–1 (10) || Franklin (2–0) || Howry (0–4) || || 36,928 || 42–35
|- align="center" bgcolor="ffbbbb"
| 78 || July 2 || @ Cardinals || 5–2 || Wellemeyer (7–7) || Zito (4–8) || Franklin (19) || 41,875 || 42–36
|- align="center" bgcolor="bbffbb"
| 79 || July 3 || Astros || 13–0 || Sadowski (2–0) || Paulino (2–5) || || 42,199 || 43–36
|- align="center" bgcolor="bbffbb"
| 80 || July 4 || Astros || 9–0 || Lincecum (9–2) || Ortiz (3–4) || || 34,582 || 44–36
|- align="center" bgcolor="ffbbbb"
| 81 || July 5 || Astros || 7–1 || Oswalt (5–4) || Johnson (8–6) || || 30,157 || 44–37
|- align="center" bgcolor="bbffbb"
| 82 || July 6 || Marlins || 5–4 || Cain (10–2) || West (3–3) || Wilson (22) || 26,995 || 45–37
|- align="center" bgcolor="bbffbb"
| 83 || July 7 || Marlins || 3–0 || Zito (5–8) || Johnson (7–2) || Romo (1) || 27,799 || 46–37
|- align="center" bgcolor="ffbbbb"
| 84 || July 8 || Marlins || 7–0 || Volstad (6–8) || Sadowski (2–1) || || 34,157 || 36–38
|- align="center" bgcolor="bbffbb"
| 85 || July 9 || Padres || 9–3 || Lincecum (10–2) || Geer (1–4) || || 33,508 || 47–38
|- align="center" bgcolor="bbffbb"
| 86 || July 10 || Padres || 8–0 || Sánchez (3–8) || Banks (1–1) || || 30,298 || 48–38
|- align="center" bgcolor="bbffbb"
| 87 || July 11 || Padres || 2–1 || Miller (2–1) || Stauffer (0–1) || Wilson (23) || 38,112 || 49–38
|- align="center" bgcolor="ffbbbb"
| 88 || July 12 || Padres || 10–4 || Correia (6–7) || Zito (5–9) || || 41,913 || 49–39
|- align="center" bgcolor="ffbbbb"
| 89 || July 17 || @ Pirates || 2–1  (14)  || Meek (1–0) || Howry (0–5) || || 26,709 || 49–40
|- align="center" bgcolor="ffbbbb"
| 90 || July 18 || @ Pirates || 2–0 || Morton (2–2) || Zito (5–10) || Capps (20) || 37,023 || 49–41
|- align="center" bgcolor="bbffbb"
| 91 || July 19 || @ Pirates || 4–3 || Cain (11–2) || Duke (8–9) || Wilson (24) || 24,842 || 50–41
|- align="center" bgcolor="ffbbbb"
| 92 || July 20 || @ Braves || 11–3 || Hanson (5–0) || Romo (2–1) || || 21,988 || 50–42
|- align="center" bgcolor="ffbbbb"
| 93 || July 21 || @ Braves || 8–1 || Lowe (9–7) || Sadowki (2–2) || || 25,135 || 50–43
|- align="center" bgcolor="ffbbbb"
| 94 || July 22 || @ Braves || 4–2 || Jurrjens (9–7) || Lincecum (10–3) || Soriano (14) || 34,672 || 50–44
|- align="center" bgcolor="bbffbb"
| 95 || July 23 || @ Braves || 5–1 || Zito (6–10) || Gonzalez (3–3) || || 31,727 || 51–44
|- align="center" bgcolor="bbffbb"
| 96 || July 24 || @ Rockies || 3–1 || Cain (12–2) || Hammel (5–5) || Wilson (25) || 40,524 || 52–44
|- align="center" bgcolor="ffbbbb"
| 97 || July 25 || @ Rockies || 8–2 || de la Rosa (8–7) || Sánchez || || 42,201 || 52–45
|- align="center" bgcolor="ffbbbb"
| 98 || July 26 || @ Rockies || 4–2 || Cook (10–3) || Sadowski (2–3) || Street (25) || 40,723 || 52–46
|- align="center" bgcolor="bbffbb"
| 99 || July 27 || Pirates || 4–2 || Lincecum (11–3) || Maholm (6–5) || || 40,008 || 53–46
|- align="center" bgcolor="bbffbb"
| 100 || July 28 || Pirates || 3–2 || Romo (3–1) || Morton (2–3) || Wilson (26) || 35,972 || 54–46
|- align="center" bgcolor="bbffbb"
| 101 || July 29 || Pirates || 1–0 (10) || Wilson (3–4) || Capps (2–6) || || 37,582 || 55–46
|- align="center" bgcolor="bbffbb"
| 102 || July 30 || Phillies || 7–2 || Sánchez (4–9) || López (3–1) || || 36,603 || 56–46
|- align="center" bgcolor="ffbbbb"
| 103 || July 31 || Phillies || 5–1 || Lee (8–9) || Sadowski (2–4) || || 33,934 || 56–47
|-

|- align="center" bgcolor="bbffbb"
| 104 || August 1 || Phillies || 2–0 || Lincecum (12–3) || Blanton (7–5) || Wilson (27) || 42,694 || 57–47
|- align="center" bgcolor="bbffbb"
| 105 || August 2 || Phillies || 7–3 || Zito (7–10) || Hamels (7–6) || || 42,744 || 58–47
|- align="center" bgcolor="ffbbbb"
| 106 || August 3 || @ Astros || 4–3 || Hampton (7–8) || Cain (12–3) || Valverde (13) || 29,835 || 58–48
|- align="center" bgcolor="bbffbb"
| 107 || August 4 || @ Astros || 8–1 || Sánchez (5–9) || Paulino (2–6) || || 29,747 || 59–48
|- align="center" bgcolor="bbffbb"
| 108 || August 5 || @ Astros || 10–6 || Martinez (2–0) || Moehler (7–7) || || 31,710 || 60–48
|- align="center" bgcolor="ffbbbb"
| 109 || August 7 || Reds || 10–5 || Weathers (3–3) || Wilson (3–5) || || 41,744 || 60–49
|- align="center" bgcolor="bbffbb"
| 110 || August 8 || Reds || 4–2 || Zito (8–10) || Arroyo (10–11) || Wilson (28) || 37,057 || 61–49
|- align="center" bgcolor="ffbbbb"
| 111 || August 9 || Reds || 5–2 || Harang (6–13) || Cain (12–4) || Cordero (24) || 36,705 || 61–50
|- align="center" bgcolor="ffbbbb"
| 112 || August 10 || Dodgers || 4–2 || Kuroda (5–5) || Sánchez (5–10) || Broxton (25) || 40,522 || 61–51
|- align="center" bgcolor="ffbbbb"
| 113 || August 11 || Dodgers || 9–1 || Wolf (6–6) || Martinez (2–1) || || 41,167 || 61–52
|- align="center" bgcolor="bbffbb"
| 114 || August 12 || Dodgers || 4–2 (10) || Wilson (4–5) || Mota (4–5) || || 43,300 || 62–52
|- align="center" bgcolor="ffbbbb"
| 115 || August 14 || @ Mets || 3–0 || Parnell (3–4) || Zito (8–11) || Rodríguez (26) || 38,997 || 62–53
|- align="center" bgcolor="bbffbb"
| 116 || August 15 || @ Mets || 5–4 (10) || Wilson (5–5) || Rodríguez (2–4) || || 39,652 || 63–53
|- align="center" bgcolor="ffbbbb"
| 117 || August 16 || @ Mets || 3–2 || Rodríguez (3–4) || Romo (3–2) || || 38,793 || 63–54
|- align="center" bgcolor="bbffbb"
| 118 || August 17 || @ Mets || 10–1 || Martinez (3–1) || Hernández (7–8) || || 38,584 || 64–54
|- align="center" bgcolor="bbffbb"
| 119 || August 18 || @ Reds || 8–5 (10) || Howry (1–5) || Cordero (1–3) || Wilson (29) || 13,334 || 65–54
|- align="center" bgcolor="bbffbb"
| 120 || August 19 || @ Reds || 1–0 || Romo (4–2) || Arroyo (11–12) || Wilson (30) || 11,302 || 66–54
|- align="center" bgcolor="ffbbbb"
| 121 || August 20 || @ Reds || 2–1 (10) || Cordero (2–3) || Howry (1–6) || || 13,390 || 66–55
|- align="center" bgcolor="bbffbb"
| 122 || August 21 || @ Rockies || 6–3 || Sánchez (6–10) || Cook (10–6) || || 43,666 || 67–55
|- align="center" bgcolor="ffbbbb"
| 123 || August 22 || @ Rockies || 14–11 || de la Rosa (12–8) || Miller (2–2) || || 47,178 || 67–56
|- align="center" bgcolor="ffbbbb"
| 124 || August 23 || @ Rockies || 4–2 || Jiménez (12–9) || Lincecum (12–4) || Street (33) || 48,704 || 67–57
|- align="center" bgcolor="ffbbbb"
| 125 || August 24 || @ Rockies || 6–4 (14) || Eaton (3–5) || Miller (2–3) || || 27,670 || 67–58
|- align="center" bgcolor="bbffbb"
| 126 || August 25 || Diamondbacks || 5–4 || Affeldt (1–1) || Rauch (2–2) || Romo (2) || 37,492 || 68–58
|- align="center" bgcolor="bbffbb"
| 127 || August 26 || Diamondbacks || 4–3 || Miller (3–3) || Qualls (2–2) || Medders (1) || 27,645 || 69–58
|- align="center" bgcolor="ffbbbb"
| 128 || August 27 || Diamondbacks || 11–0 || Petit (3–8) || Martinez (3–2) || || 28,575 || 69–59
|- align="center" bgcolor="bbffbb"
| 129 || August 28 || Rockies || 2–0 || Lincecum (13–4) || Jiménez (12–10) || Wilson (31) || 39,047 || 70–59
|- align="center" bgcolor="bbffbb"
| 130 || August 29 || Rockies || 5–3 || Zito (9–11) || Marquis (14–9) || Wilson (32) || 41,200 || 71–59
|- align="center" bgcolor="bbffbb"
| 131 || August 30 || Rockies || 9–5 || Medders (3–1) || Betancourt (1–3) || || 42,571 || 72–59
|-

|- align="center" bgcolor="ffbbbb"
| 132 || September 1 || @ Phillies || 1–0 || Hamels (8–8) || Sánchez (6–11) || || 44,679 || 72–60
|- align="center" bgcolor="bbffbb"
| 133 || September 2 || @ Phillies || 4–0 || Penny (8–8) || Happ (10–4) || || 45,086 || 73–60
|- align="center" bgcolor="ffbbbb"
| 134 || September 3 || @ Phillies || 2–1 || Martínez (3–0) || Lincecum (13–5) || Lidge (28) || 45,156 || 73–61
|- align="center" bgcolor="bbffbb"
| 135 || September 4 || @ Brewers || 3–2 || Medders (4–1) || Coffey (4–4) || Wilson (33) || 37,511 || 74–61
|- align="center" bgcolor="bbffbb"
| 136 || September 5 || @ Brewers || 3–2 || Cain (13–4) || Gallardo (12–11) || Wilson (34) || 30,254 || 75–61
|- align="center" bgcolor="ffbbbb"
| 137 || September 6 || @ Brewers || 2–1 (12) || Stetter (4–1) || Valdez (2–1) || || 36,590 || 75–62
|- align="center" bgcolor="bbffbb"
| 138 || September 7 || Padres || 9–4 || Penny (9–8) || Richard (8–5) || || 37,132 || 76–62
|- align="center" bgcolor="ffbbbb"
| 139 || September 8 || Padres || 4–3 || Gregerson (1–3) || Affeldt (1–2) || Bell (36) || 34,524 || 76–63
|- align="center" bgcolor="ffbbbb"
| 140 || September 9 || Padres || 4–2 || LeBlanc (2–1) || Zito (9–12) || Bell (37) || 30,312 || 76–64
|- align="center" bgcolor="ffbbbb"
| 141 || September 11 || Dodgers || 10–3 || Kuroda (6–6) || Cain (13–5) || || 39,212 || 76–65
|- align="center" bgcolor="ffbbbb"
| 142 || September 12 || Dodgers || 9–1 || Padilla (11–6) || Sánchez (6–12) || || 41,710 || 76–66
|- align="center" bgcolor="bbffbb"
| 143 || September 13 || Dodgers || 7–2 || Penny (10–8) || Billingsley (12–10) || || 40,579 || 77–66
|- align="center" bgcolor="bbffbb"
| 144 || September 14 || Rockies || 9–1 || Lincecum (14–5) || Hammel (8–8) || || 31,307 || 78–66
|- align="center" bgcolor="bbffbb"
| 145 || September 15 || Rockies || 10–2 || Zito (10–12) || Jiménez (13–11) || || 30,353 || 79–66
|- align="center" bgcolor="ffbbbb"
| 146 || September 16 || Rockies || 4–3 || de la Rosa (15–9) || Cain (13–6) || Betancourt (2) || 38,696 || 79–67
|- align="center" bgcolor="bbffbb"
| 147 || September 18 || @ Dodgers || 8–4 || Howry (2–4) || Troncoso (4–4) || || 53,679 || 80–67
|- align="center" bgcolor="ffbbbb"
| 148 || September 19 || @ Dodgers || 12–1 || Garland (11–11) || Penny (10–9) || || 52,438 || 80–68
|- align="center" bgcolor="ffbbbb"
| 149 || September 20 || @ Dodgers || 6–2 || Wolf (11–6) || Lincecum (14–6) || || 53,233 || 80–69
|- align="center" bgcolor="bbffbb"
| 150 || September 21 || @ Diamondbacks || 5–4 || Romo (5–2) || Vásquez (3–3) || Wilson (35) || 25,485 || 81–69
|- align="center" bgcolor="ffbbbb"
| 151 || September 22 || @ Diamondbacks || 10–8 || Davis (8–13) || Cain (13–7) || || 25,591 || 81–70
|- align="center" bgcolor="bbffbb"
| 152 || September 23 || @ Diamondbacks || 5–2 || Sánchez (7–12) || Mulvey (0–2) || Wilson (36) || 25,851 || 82–70
|- align="center" bgcolor="ffbbbb"
| 153 || September 24 || Cubs || 3–2 || Heilman (4–4) || Wilson (5–6) || Mármol (15) || 31,603 || 82–71
|- align="center" bgcolor="ffbbbb"
| 154 || September 25 || Cubs || 3–0 || Zambrano (9–6) || Lincecum (14–7) || || 33,970 || 82–72
|- align="center" bgcolor="ffbbbb"
| 155 || September 26 || Cubs || 6–2 || Gorzelanny (7–2) || Zito (10–13) || || 35,885 || 82–73
|- align="center" bgcolor="bbffbb"
| 156 || September 27 || Cubs || 5–1 || Cain (14–7) || Wells (11–10) || Wilson (37) || 38,330 || 83–73
|- align="center" bgcolor="bbffbb"
| 157 || September 29 || Diamondbacks || 8–4 || Sánchez (8–12) || Davis (8–14) || || 28,039 || 84–73
|- align="center" bgcolor="bbffbb"
| 158 || September 30 || Diamondbacks || 4–1 || Penny (11–9) || Mulvey (0–3) || || 29,473 || 85–73
|-

|-  bgcolor="ffbbbb"
|- align="center" bgcolor="bbffbb"
| 159 || October 1 || Diamondbacks || 7–3 || Lincecum (15–7) || Haren (14–10) || || 27,941 || 86–73
|- align="center" bgcolor="bbffbb"
| 160 || October 2 || @ Padres || 7–2 || Medders (5–1) || Correia (12–11) || || 26,776 ||  87–73
|- align="center" bgcolor="ffbbbb"
| 161 || October 3 || @ Padres || 2–0 || LeBlanc (3–1) || Cain (14–8) || Bell (42) || 25,732 || 87–74
|- align="center" bgcolor="bbffbb"
| 162 || October 4 || @ Padres || 4–3 (10) || Affeldt (2–2) || Webb (2–1) || Wilson''' (38) || 25,082 || 88–74
|-

Roster

Player stats

BattingNote: G = Games played; AB = At bats; R = Runs scored; H = Hits; 2B = Doubles; 3B = Triples; HR = Home runs; RBI = Runs batted in; AVG = Batting average; SB = Stolen basesPitchingNote: W = Wins; L = Losses; ERA = Earned run average; G = Games pitched; GS = Games started; SV = Saves; IP = Innings pitched; R = Runs allowed; ER = Earned runs allowed; BB = Walks allowed; K = Strikeouts''

Farm system

LEAGUE CHAMPIONS: San Jose, Salem-Keizer

References

External links
2009 San Francisco Giants schedule at MLB.com
2009 San Francisco Giants season at Baseball Reference

San Francisco Giants
San Francisco Giants seasons
San Francisco Giants